Petruccioli is an Italian surname. Notable people with the surname include:

Claudio Petruccioli (born 1941), Italian politician and journalist
Cola Petruccioli (1360–1401), Italian painter

Italian-language surnames